The 2022 Galgos de Tijuana season was the Galgos de Tijuana first season in the Liga de Fútbol Americano Profesional (LFA). The team debuted in the league under head coach Guillermo Ruiz Burguete, who had previous experience in the league as head coach of the Dinos de Saltillo during the 2017 LFA season. Galgos ended the 2022 season with a 0–6 record, becoming the first LFA team to finish a season with no wins.

Draft

Roster

Regular season

Standings

Schedule

References

2022 in American football
Galgos